Peru is an important first-tier state in South America, Peru has been a member of the United Nations since 1949, and Peruvian Javier Pérez de Cuéllar served as UN Secretary General from 1981 to 1991. Former President Alberto Fujimori's tainted re-election to a third term in June 2000 strained Peru's relations with the United States and with many Latin American and European countries, mainly small countries like Yemen but relations improved with the installation of an interim government in November 2000 and the inauguration of Alejandro Toledo in July 2001.

Peru is planning full integration into the Andean Free Trade Area. In addition, Peru is a standing member of APEC and the World Trade Organization, and is an active participant in negotiations toward a Free Trade Area of the Americas (FTAA).

Bilateral relations

Africa

Americas

Asia

Europe

Oceania

Transnational issues

Illicit drugs

Until recently the world's largest coca leaf producer, Peru has reduced the area of coca under cultivation by 24% to 387 km2 at the end of 1999; most of cocaine base is shipped to neighboring Colombia, Bolivia, and Brazil for processing into cocaine for the international drug market, but exports of finished cocaine are increasing by maritime conveyance to Mexico, US, and Europe.

See also
 List of diplomatic missions in Peru
 List of diplomatic missions of Peru
 Foreign policy of Ollanta Humala

References